The Ballad of Bering and His Friends is a 1970 Soviet adventure film directed by .

Plot 
The film tells the story of Danish explorer Vitus Bering, who, by decree of Peter the Great in 1725, led the First Kamchatka expedition and made new discoveries, expanding the borders of the Russian Empire.

Cast 
 Kārlis Sebris as Vitus Bering
 Igor Ledogorov as Dmitry Ovtsyn
 Yuri Nazarov as Aleksei Chirikov
 Valentin Nikulin as Georg Steller
 Gennadi Frolov as Starodubtsev
 Leonid Kuravlyov
 Vija Artmane as Anna Bering
 Roman Tkachuk as Tsar Peter I
 Dzidra Ritenberga as Empress Catherine I
 Nonna Mordyukova as Empress Anna Ioannovna

References

External links 
 

1970 films
1970s Russian-language films
Soviet adventure films
1970s adventure films